Arnaud Henriet is a French actor.

Filmography

References

External links

 

Living people
Year of birth missing (living people)
21st-century French male actors
French male film actors
French male television actors
20th-century French male actors